Gustav Lilienthal (October 9, 1849 – February 1, 1933) was a German social reformer, a pioneer in building and construction technology (Prefabricated buildings), inventor of different Construction sets (e. g. Anchor Stone Blocks) and involved in the pioneering work  of his brother, Otto Lilienthal in aviation.

References

External links

Gustav Lilienthal on the website of Otto-Lilienthal-Museum

German aviators
1933 deaths
1849 births
German social reformers
19th-century German inventors
Otto Lilienthal